Darlington Memorial Cemetery, also known as the Darlington Community Cemetery or the Darlington City Cemetery, is a historic African-American cemetery located at Darlington, Darlington County, South Carolina. The cemetery dates from 1890, and until 1946 it was the only African-American cemetery within the city limits of Darlington. It was expanded by four additional acres in 1946, for a total of approximately nine acres. There are approximately 1,900 graves in the cemetery, with most burials dating from the early- to mid-20th century.

It was listed on the National Register of Historic Places in 2005. Burials at the cemetery include:
 James Lawrence Cain (1871–1944), educator
 Isaac Brockenton (1928–1908), minister and public figure
 Edmund H. Deas (1855–1915), politician
 Lawrence Reese (1864–1915), merchant and artisan
 Mable K. Howard (d. 1963), educator

References

External links
 

African-American history of South Carolina
Cemeteries on the National Register of Historic Places in South Carolina
1890 establishments in South Carolina
Buildings and structures in Darlington County, South Carolina
National Register of Historic Places in Darlington County, South Carolina
Darlington, South Carolina
African-American cemeteries